The Bank of Algeria is the central bank of Algeria. The bank is located in Algiers and its current governor is Salah Eddine Taleb. It was established following Algerian independence in 1962 to take over the former activities in the country of the Banque de l'Algérie, the colonial central bank of French Algeria.

The Bank of Algeria sets the conditions under which banks and financial institutions in Algeria and abroad can be allowed to be in Algeria and to operate there. It establishes, moreover, the conditions under which such authority may be amended or withdrawn.

The organization of the bank includes the Conseil de la Monnaie et du Crédit, the Commission Bancaire (Banking Commission) and the Bank of Algeria itself.

Governors
Seghir Mostefaï, 1962 - 1981
Mahfoud Aoufi, 1981 - 1982
Rachid Bouraoui, 1982 - 1985
Bader Eddine Nouioua, 1985 - 1989
, 1989 - 1992
Abdelwahab Keramane, 1992 - 2001
Mohamed Laksaci, 2001 - 31 May 2016
, 31 May 2016 - 31 March 2019
Amar Hiouani (Interim), 20 April 2019
Aïmene Benabderrahmane, 14 November 2019 - 23 July 2020
Rosthom Fadli (Interim), 23 June 2020
Rosthom Fadli, 15 Septembre 2020 - 23 May 2022
Salah Eddine Taleb, 23 May 2022 - present

See also

Algerian dinar, Algeria's currency
Central banks and currencies of Africa
Economy of Algeria
List of central banks
List of banks in the Arab world

References

External links

Algeria Banking Information

1962 establishments in Algeria
Banks of Algeria
Economy of Algeria
Algeria
Algiers
Banks established in 1962